Kevin Stoney (22 January 1921 – 22 January 2008) was an English actor. He was best known for his television roles, in which he became familiar for his "portrayal of establishment types".

During the Second World War, Stoney served with the Royal Air Force. On television, he appeared in three serials of the science fiction series Doctor Who over a period of ten years, playing Mavic Chen in The Daleks' Master Plan (1965), Tobias Vaughn in The Invasion (1968) and Tyrum in Revenge of the Cybermen (1975). Stoney also appeared in two episodes of another BBC science fiction series, Blake's 7, playing Councillor Joban in the episode Hostage and Ardus in the episode Animals. He also played the astrologer Thrasyllus in the 1976 BBC adaptation of I, Claudius, a role he had earlier played in Granada Television's 1969 series The Caesars.

Other credits include: The Adventures of Robin Hood, The Saint, Danger Man, The Avengers, Dr. Finlay's Casebook, The Prisoner, Softly, Softly, Man in a Suitcase, The Troubleshooters, Doomwatch, Freewheelers, Z-Cars, The Tomorrow People, Ace of Wands, Special Branch, The Onedin Line, Fall of Eagles, Space: 1999, The New Avengers, Quatermass, Hammer House of Horror, Bergerac, All Creatures Great and Small, The Bill and in the highest-rated episode of Inspector Morse.

In 1985, it was reported in the Doctor Who fan magazine DWB that Stoney had died at the age of 64, but in 1987 he made an appearance at a Doctor Who convention to prove he was very much alive, to the shock of the fans.  He retired in 1993. Stoney died on his 87th birthday, 22 January 2008, in Chiswick, after a long battle with skin cancer.

Selected filmography
 Interpol (1957) – Policeman (uncredited)
 How to Murder a Rich Uncle (1957) – Bar Steward
 Return of a Stranger (1961) – Wayne
 Shadow of the Cat (1961) – Father (uncredited)
 Cash on Demand (1961) – Detective Inspector Bill Mason
 Strongroom (1962) – Police Sergeant
 Jigsaw (1962) – Mr. Gardner (uncredited)
 The Boys (1962) – Police Inspector who is quizzed by QCS at the Trial (uncredited)
 On the Run (1963) – Wally Lucas
 Murder at the Gallop (1963) – Doctor Markwell
 Danger Man (TV series, 'Say It With Flowers') (1965) – Papa Buchler
 The Blood Beast Terror (1968) – Granger
 The Assassination Bureau (1969) – Blind Beggar (uncredited)
 Guns in the Heather (1969) – Enhardt
 All Quiet on the Western Front (1979) – Hollerstein (uncredited)
 Ivanhoe (1982) – Fitzurse
 The Dresser (1983) – C. Rivers Lane
 Pope John Paul II (1984) – Bishop Dygat
 Ordeal by Innocence (1985) – Solicitor

References

External links

 Obituary: Guardian

1921 births
2008 deaths
Deaths from cancer in England
Deaths from skin cancer
English male film actors
English male television actors
Royal Air Force personnel of World War II